Río Murta Airport  is an airport serving Puerto Murta (es), a village in the Aysén Region of Chile. The airport and village are at the north end of an arm of General Carrera Lake.

There is mountainous terrain immediately east of the airport. Approaches from the south are over the water.

See also

Transport in Chile
List of airports in Chile

References

External links
OpenStreetMap - Río Murta
OurAirports - Río Murta
SkyVector - Río Murta
FallingRain - Río Murta Airport

Airports in Chile
Airports in Aysén Region